Serguei Likhanski is a former pair skater who competed for the Soviet Union. With skating partner Inna Bekker, he is a two-time World Junior medalist (silver in 1982, bronze in 1983) and the 1983 Nebelhorn Trophy champion. They were coached by Irina Rodnina in Moscow.

Likhanski moved to the United States after retiring from competition. As of 2014, he lives in Berkley, Michigan.

Competitive highlights 
(with Bekker)

References 

1960s births
Living people
Figure skaters from Moscow
Soviet male pair skaters
Soviet emigrants to the United States
World Junior Figure Skating Championships medalists
People from Berkley, Michigan